Serena Williams and Venus Williams were the defending champions, but none competed this year.

Åsa Carlsson and Natasha Zvereva won the title by defeating Silvia Farina and Karina Habšudová 6–3, 6–4 in the final.

Seeds

Draw

Draw

References
 Official results archive (ITF)
 Official results archive (WTA)

Faber Grand Prix
2000 WTA Tour